Jalan Lingkaran Pulau Indah or  Persiaran Pulau Lumut is a major highway in the Klang Valley region, Malaysia. It is the only main route to South Klang Valley Expressway E26.

At most sections, it was built under the JKR R5 road standard, allowing maximum speed limit of up to 90 km/h.

List of interchanges

References

Highways in Malaysia
Expressways and highways in the Klang Valley
Malaysian Federal Roads